Gemma Louise Ruegg (born 1984), also known as Gemma Hewitt, is a British female boxer and business owner from Bournemouth, Dorset.

After suffering mental health difficulties and alcohol addiction in her youth, she took up sport on the advice of her family doctor. She went on to become the first female boxing champion at two weight classes in the QBL after winning the regional welterweight title, ten weeks after giving birth to her sixth child.

Her trainer is husband Danny Ruegg, and her son Mace is also a professional boxer.

In 2016 she formed the fitness apparel clothing brand Combat Dollies, where she serves as director.

Early life

From the age of 16, Gemma had an alcohol addiction and suffered with depression and self-harm. When the family doctor advised her to join a gym, Gemma took up boxing as a source of focus, it turned her life around. She said:

She married Danny Ruegg in 2016 and has eight children; six of her own and two step-children. Following her doctor's guidelines, she trained throughout her pregnancy and regularly takes her children with her to the gym.

Career

Mixed Martial Arts

Gemma had two professional bouts as a bantamweight fighter, and one amateur bout, both with promoter House of Pain.

Pro Boxing

After winning two regional titles in two different weight categories at the Queensbury Boxing League, Gemma was granted her professional licence in June 2021. She signed with Dorset boxing promoter Steve Bendall, at SK4 Promotions.

Combat Dollies

In 2016, Gemma set up the fitness apparel clothing brand Combat Dollies. She stated:

Her gymwear has been featured in the 28th season of the TV show The Ultimate Fighter, worn by Invicta fighting champion MMA fighter Pannie Kianzad.

She is the sole director of the company.

References

External links
 Official Combat Dollies Website
 Gemma Ruegg Fighter profile, Tapology
 Gemma Hewitt Fighter profile, Tapology

Living people
1984 births